Vili Taskinen (10 October 1874, Juva – 20 October 1930) was a Finnish farmer and politician. He was a Member of the Parliament of Finland, representing the Finnish Party from 1916 to 1917 and the National Progressive Party from February to March 1919 and again from 1920 to 1922.

References

1874 births
1930 deaths
People from Juva
People from Mikkeli Province (Grand Duchy of Finland)
Finnish Party politicians
National Progressive Party (Finland) politicians
Members of the Parliament of Finland (1916–17)
Members of the Parliament of Finland (1917–19)
Members of the Parliament of Finland (1919–22)